Leucochroma is a genus of moths of the family Crambidae.

Species
Leucochroma colombiensis Hampson, 1912
Leucochroma corope (Stoll in Cramer & Stoll, 1781)
Leucochroma formosalis Amsel, 1956
Leucochroma hololeuca (Hampson, 1912)
Leucochroma jamaicensis Hampson, 1912
Leucochroma neutralis

References

Spilomelinae
Crambidae genera
Taxa named by Achille Guenée